Ana Pardo de Vera Posada (born 1974) is a Spanish journalist. Since 2016 she has been the chief editor of the online newspaper Público.

Biography 

Born in Lugo, Galicia, Pardo de Vera is a graduate in Spanish Philology, has a master's degree in Communication and Media studies, and has studied Political Science and Sociology at the National University of Distance Education. She has written in several media such as Diario 16, La Voz de Galicia, Tiempo and El Siglo de Europa and has collaborated in various radio and television shows. In 2007 she helped found the newspaper Público.

During José Luis Rodríguez Zapatero's government, she was a communication advisor for the Ministries of Defence, Industry, Tourism and Commerce and the Vice-Presidency of Territorial Policy.

Her sister Isabel, younger by one year, is an engineer.

Books 

 En la maleta de Zapatero (2013).

References 

1974 births
21st-century Spanish writers
21st-century Spanish women writers
Living people
Spanish women journalists
People from Lugo